The right of (legislative) initiative is the constitutionally defined power to propose a new law (bill) in a legislature.

The right of initiative is usually given to both the government (executive) and individual legislators.

However, some systems may restrict this right to legislators acting alone or with others (such as in the United States) or to the government (such as in the European Union). This, however, does not preclude the executive from suggesting the introduction of certain laws to their backers in the legislature, or even from members of the executive from introducing laws by themselves in systems that allow simultaneous membership in the executive and the legislature.

Bicameral legislatures may restrict the right of initiative to the members of the lower house only, or allow members of the upper house to introduce bills to the lower house (such as in the Czech Republic).

Groups with a right of initiative 
Almost all countries give the right of legislative initiative to members of parliament, either as individuals or as part of a group. Depending on the country other groups of people may have the ability to initiate legislation including:

 heads of state, such as a president or a monarch
 Heads of government that are not also the head of state, such as a prime minister
 A cabinet as a whole, or an individual government minister
 Political parties
 Courts and government agencies
 Local governments, normally present in a federal system
 Academic institutions
 Businesses and companies
 Groups of citizens, normally with a signature quota
 Individual citizens alone

Netherlands 
The power to make a legislative proposal  in the Netherlands is held by the members of the Dutch government and other members of the House of Representatives. Both have the right of initiative . The right of initiative is regulated in the Dutch Constitution:

 Article 82 paragraph 1: Bills can be submitted by or on behalf of the King and the House of Representatives of the States General.

The Senate has no right of initiative as an independent body. There is, however, a right of initiative for the joint meeting of the States General (House and Senate together).

The right of initiative of the Crown and the States General had already been formulated in Article 46 of the Constitution for the United Netherlands of 1814:

 Article 46. The Sovereign Prince has the right to propose laws and other proposals to the States General, as well as to approve or not approve the nominations made by the States General to Him. (...)

In more than 95% of all cases, the government takes the lead in drafting a law. A member of the House of Representatives can receive assistance from the Legislation Bureau . MPs will make more frequent use of their right of amendment, or the right to propose amendments to a bill.

Belgium 

In Belgium, the executive (officially the king and his ministers, but the king has no actual power) as well as members of the Senate and the Chamber of Representatives have the right of initiative. The executive must always exercise its right of initiative in the House (according to Belgian separation of powers, the executive also has the right of initiative). 

If the Senate or the House exercises its right of initiative, it is referred to as a law project (wetsontwerp in Dutch, projet de loi in French). If the executive does so, this is referred to as a law proposal (wetsvoorstel in Dutch, proposition de loi in French). If the executive submits a bill, it must be sent to the Legislation Department of the Council of State for advice. This is a substantial requirement of form, i.e. non-compliance can lead to the annulment of the law.

France

In France, ministerial bills are called law projects and parliament's bills are called law proposals.

Law projects
In France,  bills are proposed by the government. One of the ministers propose the bill to those concerned by his or her application. Then, if the different ministers agree,  the bill is sent to the secrétariat général du gouvernement and then to the Conseil d'État, the Council of Ministers,  Parliament, and so on...
The Conseil d'État (and sometimes the Constitutional Council) has the duty to advise the government on projects of law.

Law proposals
Any MP can propose a law to Parliament.
Law proposals, unlike law projects, can be directly deposed if they do not increase the state's expenditure.

Both kind of bills can first be deposed either to the Senate or the National Assembly

Only 10% of laws that  are passed are proposed by Members of Parliament.
This is mainly because the government has several means to limit the power of Parliament:
the Government fixes most of the agenda of both chambers, and 
the Government can, under certain conditions, prevent Parliament from modifying its texts.

The legislative initiative of Parliament has both good and bad points.
The principal criticism is that lobbies could persuade Parliament to satisfy them before other citizens.
On the other hand, legislative initiative is the best way for Parliament to defend itself against possible encroachments to its power.

European Union

The European Commission has a near monopoly for legislative initiative, whereas in many Parliamentary systems there is a mechanism whereby members of the parliament may introduce bills. This ranges from insignificant in the UK Parliament (see Private Members' Bills in the Parliament of the United Kingdom), through quite significant in the Israeli Knesset, to being the only way bills can be introduced in the US Congress. In most parliaments, the ability of members to introduce legislation is severely limited in practice. Under the Treaty of Maastricht enhanced by the Lisbon Treaty, the European Parliament has an indirect right of legislative initiative that allows it to ask the Commission to submit a proposal, though to reject the request the Commission only needs to "inform the European Parliament of the reasons". Member states also have an indirect right of legislative initiative concerning the Common Foreign and Security Policy.
Over 80% of all proposals by the Commission were initially requested by other bodies.

Some politicians, including Jean-Pierre Chevènement and Dominique Strauss-Kahn, feel that the Commission's monopoly on legislative initiative prevents the emergence or development of real democratic debate.

Citizens also have legislative initiative in the EU by the procedure of a European Citizens' Initiative, in which at least a million signatures by EU citizens need to be obtained in at least a quarter of EU member states.

Further reading 
Glossary of Legislative Terms {Act} at okhouse.gov
 Assemblée nationale - LA PROCÉDURE LÉGISLATIVE
Speech by José Manuel BARROSO, President of the European Commission, At the inauguration of the Academic Year 2004-2005, College of Europe, Bruges, 23 November 2004
EUROPA - Glossary - Right of initiative

See also 
 Article One of the United States Constitution
 Constitution of the Republic of China
 Legislature

References

External links
Report on the Legislative Initiative and Annex, Venice Commission (2008)

Legislative legal terminology
Statutory law